Adam Wybe, also known as Adam Wiebe (born July 12, 1584 in Harlingen, Friesland, died in 1653 in Danzig (Gdańsk)), was an engineer and inventor of Dutch origin, active mainly in Danzig. His work includes the world's first cable car on multiple supports in 1644. It was the biggest built until the end of the 19th century.

Outside of his village of origin- Harlingen, Friesland- no details are known of his youth and there is no record on his parents. His wife's name was Margarethe.

Wybe lived in Danzig after ca. 1616. He became famous for many inventions and constructions: a horse-driven dredger, river ice cutter, and an aqueduct taking Radunia River waters over the moat in the Hucisko crossroads area. The construction in 1644 of a rope railway was his most famous creation. During previous centuries there were already ropeways which resembled cable cars in existence, but Wybe changed and improved it as follows: It is the first to use a cable industrially (instead of a rope) in loop and continuous motion, and the first to multiply the 'vehicles'. He also improved it by supporting the cable with pylons equipped with pulleys, and unloaded of the basket 'vehicles' by means of a swing. The machine was longer than 200 meters. It includes 7 wooden pylons, and seems to carry a score of about 120 'vehicles'.

References

16th-century births
1653 deaths
Emigrants from the Dutch Republic to the Polish-Lithuanian Commonwealth
Dutch engineers
Dutch Mennonites
Sustainable transport pioneers